A figure space or numeric space is a typographic unit equal to the size of a single numerical digit. Its size can fluctuate somewhat depending on which font is being used.  This is the preferred space to use in numbers. It has the same width as a digit and keeps the number together for the purpose of line breaking.

Standard
In Unicode it is assigned .

Baudot code may include a figure space. It is character 23 on the Hughes telegraph typewheel.

See also
 Digit grouping
 Em (typography)
 En (typography)
 Non-breaking space
 Space (punctuation)
 Thin space
 Whitespace character
 Word joiner

References 

Control characters
Typography
Unicode special code points
Unicode formatting code points
Whitespace